Tyconda was a sternwheel steamboat of the Puget Sound Mosquito Fleet, later transferred to the Stikine River.

Career
Tyconda was built in 1898 for the Lorentz Brothers, a steamboat family active in Puget Sound maritime affairs. Tyconda was the only sternwheeler the Lorentz Brothers ever owned. The vessel had a shallow draft, and was able to pull close in to beaches for embarking and disembarking passengers, and loading and unloading freight. In 1914, the vessel was sold to be transferred to the Stikine River in southeastern Alaska. After several runs up the Stikine, the vessel was assessed as being underpowered for that river and was transferred to the Anchorage, Alaska area to be operated on the Susitna River. On October 8, 1915 the vessel was destroyed by fire at Anchorage.

References
 Affleck, Edwin L, ed. A Century of Paddlewheelers in the Pacific Northwest, the Yukon, and Alaska, Alexander Nicholls Press, Vancouver, BC (2000) 
 Findlay, Jean Cammon and Paterson, Robin, Mosquito Fleet of Southern Puget Sound, (2008) Arcadia Publishing 

1898 ships
Steamboats of Washington (state)
Steamboats of the Stikine River
Transportation in Alaska
Passenger ships of the United States